Mitragyna stipulosa is a species of flowering plant in the family Rubiaceae. It is found in Angola, Cameroon, Central African Republic, the Republic of the Congo, the Democratic Republic of the Congo, Gabon, Gambia, Ghana, Guinea, Nigeria, Senegal, Sierra Leone, Sudan, Uganda, and Zambia. Its natural habitats are subtropical or tropical moist lowland forests and subtropical or tropical swamps. It is threatened by habitat loss.

Sources 

Naucleeae
Vulnerable plants
Flora of West Tropical Africa
Flora of West-Central Tropical Africa
Flora of Chad
Flora of Sudan
Flora of Angola
Flora of Zambia